Novaya Derevnya is a rural locality (a village) in Chushevitskoye Rural Settlement, Verkhovazhsky District, Vologda Oblast, Russia. The population was 53 as of 2002.

Geography 
The distance to Verkhovazhye is 40.5 km, to Chushevitsy is 7.3 km. Kudrino, Dresvyanka, Zuyevskiye are the nearest rural localities.

References 

Rural localities in Verkhovazhsky District